Hydrangea kwangtungensis is a species of flowering plant in the family Hydrangeaceae, native to China.

References

kwangtungensis
Flora of China